Kautilya Government Sarvodaya Bal Vidyalaya is a public senior secondary school undertaking of Government of Delhi, located in Chirag Enclave, New Delhi. It is one of 1093 government schools run by Delhi Directorate of Education which is a department under the education ministry of Delhi Government that manages the city's public school system.

References

Schools in Delhi